Chalkhill may refer to:

 Chalkhill (estate), an estate in Brent, north-west London
 Chalkhill blue, a type of butterfly in the family Lycaenidae
 John Chalkhill, English poet
 Chalkhill, Pennsylvania, an unincorporated community in Wharton Township, Fayette County, Pennsylvania

See also 
 Chalk Hill (disambiguation)